Mecyna mauretanica is a moth in the family Crambidae. It was described by Slamka in 2013. It is found in Morocco.

References

Moths described in 2013
Spilomelinae